Elections to the Baseball Hall of Fame for 1950 were subject to one rules change, the elimination of a runoff election by the baseball writers in case of no winner, which had been used the year prior. The Baseball Writers' Association of America (BBWAA) voted once by mail to select from major league players retired less than 25 years, and elected no one. Meanwhile, the Old-Timers Committee, with jurisdiction over earlier players and other figures, did not meet. For the first time, except years without any election activity, there were no new Hall of Fame members.

BBWAA election 

The 10-year members of the BBWAA had the authority to select any players active in 1925 or later, provided they had not been active in 1949. The year before, a 25-year moving boundary regarding player activity had been established which would remain in the years to come. Voters were instructed to cast votes for 10 candidates; any candidate receiving votes on at least 75% of the ballots would be honored with induction to the Hall.

A new rule had been added for the 1950 ballot. Writers could not vote for anyone currently wearing a baseball uniform, which included some qualified players who were now coaches on teams. This rule would be dropped after a few years.

A total of 168 ballots were cast, with 1,481 individual votes for 100 specific candidates, an average of 8.82 per ballot; 126 votes were required for election. Once again, no candidate received 75% of the vote and the Hall of Fame would not elect any new players in 1950. Candidates who have since been selected in subsequent elections are indicated in italics:

Sources

References

External links
1950 Election at www.baseballhalloffame.org

Baseball Hall of Fame balloting
1950 in baseball